Cheyenne Nichole Kimball (born July 27, 1990) is an American singer-songwriter, guitarist, and mandolinist. Her debut album, The Day Has Come, was released in July 2006, coinciding with an MTV reality series following her entry into the music industry. This album produced a chart single on the Billboard Hot 100 in "Hanging On." From 2008 to 2011, she was a member of the country music band Gloriana, which made its chart debut in 2009.

Career
Kimball was signed to Epic Records. She appeared on and won the TV show America's Most Talented Kid at the age of twelve. She released her Epic Records debut album, The Day Has Come, on July 11, 2006, with her first single and video, "Hanging On", sent to Top 40 mainstream radio and video outlets (VH1 and MTV) in early April 2006. She began her first cross-country tour on April 17 to promote her single and album.

To further promote her music, she had an MTV television show called Cheyenne, which premiered May 31, 2006, at 10:30 pm EST in the United States. The show later premiered on June 21, 2006, in Canada. She also appeared on the Aquamarine movie soundtrack with the song One Original Thing, the song was released as a single in October 2006. She has released the iTunes exclusive single "Drift Away". On December 5, 2006, Kimball's reality show DVD was released. Her song "Four Walls" was released as a single in January. Kimball performed in the 2006 Macy's Thanksgiving Day Parade singing "Four Walls" and live at the Pro Bowl on February 10, 2007.

In 2008, Kimball put her solo career on hold. She joined the country music band Gloriana, in which she sang and played mandolin. The band made its chart debut in 2009 with the single "Wild at Heart", a Top 20 country hit and released their self-titled debut album in August 2009. The band served as one of the opening acts for Taylor Swift's Fearless Tour in 2009 along with Kellie Pickler. Gloriana also appeared in the 2010 Macy's Thanksgiving Day Parade on November 25, 2010.  After continued success including two more Top 40 country singles, Gloriana began work on their second studio album in 2011. The band released the first single from the album called "Wanna Take You Home". This would be the last Gloriana single to feature Kimball's vocals.

On July 11, 2011, it was announced on Gloriana's official website that Kimball had left the band. She announced her departure on Gloriana's official Twitter page on July 9, 2011. However, her tweet was later deleted.

Discography

Studio albums

Singles

Music videos

MTV show

Episode list
 "Meet Cheyenne" (First broadcast on May 31, 2006)
 "Manifest Destiny" (First broadcast on June 7, 2006)
 "You'll Never Guess Where I'm Texting You From" (First broadcast on June 14, 2006)
 "Wish You Were Here" (First broadcast on June 21, 2006)
 "Almost Vacation" (First broadcast on June 28, 2006)
 "Almost Famous" (First broadcast on July 5, 2006)
 "Dress Away" (First broadcast on July 12, 2006)
 "The End Is the Beginning" (First broadcast on July 19, 2006)
 Cheyenne's reality show DVD was released on December 5, 2006

References

External links

 

1990 births
American mandolinists
American child singers
American women country singers
American country singer-songwriters
Living people
Participants in American reality television series
American women pop singers
American country mandolinists
American country guitarists
21st-century American women singers
21st-century American women guitarists
21st-century American guitarists
21st-century American singers